Kaisi is the name of mountain in Matupi township. It is the northern part of Matupi and Amsol village, inside the Sizo tribal territory. It is originally called Kiasie, name given by the local tribes. The mountain range started from Chheihlu village in the north in India.

Chin State